Rakesh Pattnaik (born 30 June 1992) is an Indian cricketer. He made his List A debut on 26 February 2021, for Odisha in the 2020–21 Vijay Hazare Trophy.

References

External links
 

1992 births
Living people
Indian cricketers
Odisha cricketers
Cricketers from Odisha
People from Khordha district